Nemanja Anđušić (born 17 October 1996) is a Bosnian professional footballer who plays as a midfielder for Bosnian Premier League club Velež Mostar.

Honours
Sarajevo
Bosnian Premier League: 2014–15

Velež Mostar
Bosnian Cup: 2021–22

References

External links
Nemanja Anđušić at Sofascore

1996 births
Living people
People from Trebinje
Association football midfielders
Bosnia and Herzegovina footballers
Bosnia and Herzegovina youth international footballers 
Bosnia and Herzegovina under-21 international footballers 
FK Leotar players
FK Sarajevo players
NK Travnik players
FK Olimpik players
NK Čelik Zenica players
FK Mladost Doboj Kakanj players
Trabzonspor footballers
Balıkesirspor footballers
FK Velež Mostar players
Premier League of Bosnia and Herzegovina players
TFF First League players
Bosnia and Herzegovina expatriate footballers
Expatriate footballers in Turkey
Bosnia and Herzegovina expatriate sportspeople in Turkey